Chandrajit Yadav  was an Indian politician.  He was elected to the Lok Sabha,  the lower house of the Parliament of India from Azamgarh constituency in 1967, 1971 as member of the Indian National Congress, and lost to Ram Naresh Yadav of Janata Party in 1977. When Indira Gandhi split the party, he remained with the 'Socialist'group, and came third in Azamgarh bypoll of 1978 won by Mohsina Kidwai of Indira Congress. He then left Congress and won from Azamgarh in 1980 as Janata Party (Secular) candidate. Then he was back in Congress and lost in Phulpur in 1989 Lok Sabha elections. He won from Azamgarh in 1991 Lok Sabha elections as a Janata Dal candidate.

He was the Union Minister of Steel and Mines in the Indira Gandhi Ministry.

References

External links
 Official Biographical Sketch Member of Parliament

1930 births
2007 deaths
Janata Dal politicians
Indian National Congress politicians
Lok Sabha members from Uttar Pradesh
India MPs 1967–1970
India MPs 1971–1977
India MPs 1980–1984
India MPs 1991–1996
Politicians from Azamgarh district
Steel Ministers of India
Members of the Cabinet of India
Janata Party (Secular) politicians
Lok Dal politicians
Indian National Congress (U) politicians